Dibley may refer to:

 Dibley, the fictional English village where sitcom The Vicar of Dibley is set
 Mary Dibley (1883–1968), British film actress
 Colin Dibley (born 1946), Australian tennis player
 Janet Dibley (born 1958), English TV actress